Polish 9th Infantry Division may refer to:
 9th Infantry Division (Poland) (1920-1939)
 Polish 9th Infantry Division (Armia Krajowa) of Armia Krajowa (9 Podlaska Dywizja Piechoty AK)
 Polish 9th Infantry Division (1942), formed and disbanded in 1942 as part of the Anders Army

fr:9e Division d'infanterie (Pologne)